The House of the Ogre (Spanish: La casa del ogro) is a 1939 Mexican film.

External links
 

1939 films
1930s Spanish-language films
Films directed by Fernando de Fuentes
Mexican black-and-white films
Mexican comedy-drama films
1939 comedy-drama films
1930s Mexican films